William Blair may refer to:
William Blair (American politician) (1820–1880), member of the Wisconsin State Senate
William Blair (Australian footballer) (1912–1960), Australian footballer and umpire
William Blair (Ayrshire MP) (died 1841), Member of Parliament for Ayrshire 1829–1832
William Blair (judge) (born 1950), British judge and KC; elder brother of U.K. prime minister Tony Blair
William Blair (Nova Scotia politician) (1836–1919), farmer and political figure in Nova Scotia, Canada
William Blair (Royal Navy officer) (1741–1782), Scottish sailor and captain in the Royal Navy
William Blair (Scottish footballer) (born 1872), Scottish international footballer
William Blair (surgeon) (1766–1822), British surgeon and writer on ciphers
William D. Blair, Jr (1937–2006), reporter, State Department spokesman, president of The Nature Conservancy
William Gourlay Blair (1890–1957), Canadian politician and physician
William H. Blair (1821–1888), American Civil War Union Brevet Brigadier General
William John Blair (1875–1943), Canadian engineer and politician
William M. Blair (1884–1982), investment banker from Chicago
William McCormick Blair Jr. (1916–2015), U.S. ambassador; son of William M. Blair
William Newsham Blair (1841–1891), New Zealand engineer and surveyor
William R. Blair (1874–1962), American scientist and U.S. Army officer
William R.N. Blair, Canadian psychologist and academic administrator
William W. Blair (1828–1896), leader in the Reorganized Church of Jesus Christ of Latter Day Saints
William Blair Tennent (1898–1976), New Zealand politician and cabinet minister
Willie Blair (born 1965), American baseball player

Companies
William Blair & Company, a Chicago-based investment banking firm founded by William M. Blair

See also
Bill Blair (disambiguation)